DMAX is an American manufacturer of diesel engines for trucks, based in of Dayton, Ohio. DMAX, originally announced in 1997, is a 60-40 joint venture between and operated by General Motors and Isuzu. Diesel engine production started in July 2000. The company's Duramax V8 engine has been extremely successful for GM, raising that company's diesel pickup market share to 30% in 2002, up from approximately 5% in 1999.

The DMAX plant was built on a land grant site adjacent to a GM plant that made the  6.2/6.5 L Diesel V8. Production of that engine began in 1982.

The plant is planning to increase production from 580 engines a day, in 2017, to 700 engines a day.

Engines
 Circle L engine – 1.7 L I4 (produced at Isuzu Motors Polska)
 DMAX V6 engine – 3.0 L V6 (Isuzu 6DE1) (produced in Fujisawa, Kanagawa, Japan)
 Duramax V8 engine – 6.6 L V8 (produced at DMAX)

References

External links
 

General Motors factories
Isuzu
Joint ventures
Diesel engine manufacturers
Companies based in Dayton, Ohio
1998 establishments in Ohio
Engine manufacturers of the United States